Julian Richards may refer to:

 Julian C. Richards, British television and radio presenter, writer and archaeologist
 Julian D. Richards, British archaeologist and professor
 Julian Richards (director), Welsh film director